Johnny González may refer to:

 Jhonny González (born 1981), Mexican boxer
 Johnny González (weightlifter) (born 1975), Colombian weightlifter